Mulchatna may refer to:
Mulchatna River, in Alaska
Mulchatna (planet), named after the river